Brandon Ash (born July 17, 1977) is an American professional stock car racing driver. He competed part-time in the NASCAR Cup Series each year from 2002 to 2010, usually attempting races on the west coast. He also competed part-time and full-time in the NASCAR West Series.

Racing career

Ash's career began in racing karts. After Ash won the Late Model Sportsman track championship at Coos Bay (Ore.) International Speedway, he decided to start racing in the NASCAR Winston West Series. He raced a limited number of events in 1996 and 1997. He ran full-time in 1998 when he was one of three rookies to win a pole position. He nearly won his first series event at Sears Point that year, but his car ran out of fuel just short of the finish line. He has recorded one win in the series, a 2002 victory in Kansas.

He made his Nextel Cup debut at Infineon Raceway in 2004 with his own team, where he finished 41st in his No. 02 car. In 2005, he raised eyebrows by qualifying eighteenth at Kansas Speedway, and ran well in the opening laps before he was spun by Dale Earnhardt Jr.

In 2006, Ash made two races, finishing 43rd in the Subway Fresh 500 at Phoenix International Raceway, and qualifying 43rd for the Dodge/Save Mart 350 at Infineon Raceway. He led one lap at Phoenix.

In 2007, Ash attempted to qualify for the race at Infineon Raceway. His qualifying speed was 40th of 52 cars, but he did not qualify fast enough to make the race. All teams outside of the top 35 in points qualify for eight starting positions, and Ash's speed was too slow. Ash failed to qualify for the 2009 Sprint Cup event in Phoenix, which made it his 15th DNQ in 20 career Sprint Cup attempts.

In 2008, Ash only attempted to qualify for the Cup Series race at Sonoma and failed to qualify.

In 2009, he began to the season by attempting the spring race at Phoenix, which he also failed to qualify for, but he did qualify for the race at Sonoma that year. With sponsorship from Efusjon Energy Club, Ash started 43rd but ran 25th most of the day. He would finish 41st after he was wrecked. He would also attempt the fall race at Phoenix but again failed to qualify.

In 2010, Ash attempted to qualify for two races: Phoenix International Raceway and Infineon Raceway, failing to qualifying for both of them. He was the slowest out of the go or go homers at Phoenix but barely missed the race at Infineon missing it by three one-hundredths of a second. These were his most recent attempts in the Cup Series and NASCAR.

Ash did not attempt any races in the Cup Series and any other NASCAR series in 2011 and has not each year since then.

On August 14, 2021, Ash competed in the Outlaw 100, a Pacific Racing Association race held at his home track of Douglas County Speedway located in his hometown of Roseburg, Oregon.

Personal life
Ash is a graduate of Oakland High School in Oakland, Oregon. He is married to Tiffany, and the couple has three children. As of 2021, he is a resident of Roseburg, Oregon.

Motorsports career results

NASCAR
(key) (Bold – Pole position awarded by qualifying time. Italics – Pole position earned by points standings or practice time. * – Most laps led.)

Sprint Cup Series

West Series

References

External links
 
 

1977 births
Living people
NASCAR drivers
People from Oakland, Oregon
Racing drivers from Oregon